Big Daddy's BBQ Sauce was a company that produced barbecue sauce. The company was based in Yukon, Oklahoma.

History
The original recipe came from a homemade barbecue sauce made by company founder Daniel Lloyd Sr. The company went public in 1998 after it began selling both Lloyd's sauce as well as one made by a family friend. It later began distributing its products to various national supermarket chains.

Auto racing 
The company has involved itself with several autoracing sponsorship programs such as the Indy Racing League, NHRA, along with Donlavey Racing and Larry Hedrick Motorsports in the NASCAR Winston Cup Series and Bill Catania in the American Speed Association. However, the company soon fell under controversy, with multiple instances of not living up to its financial obligations. Big Daddy's had signed to fully sponsor the No. 90 Donlavey Racing Ford for the 1999 season. However, during Speedweeks 1999, Big Daddy's had yet to pay Donlavey any money, and the company's logos were stripped from the car. Big Daddy's would return in 2000, this time sponsoring the No. 41 Larry Hedrick Motorsports Chevy. Again, controversy soon followed as Big Daddy's once again defaulted on payment. Unlike Donlavey's team, Hedrick was unable to find new sponsorship, and was forced to close his team down. The company was the title sponsor of South Boston Speedway in 2002 and 2003. During the time the track was known as Big Daddy's South Boston Speedway.

References

Food and drink companies established in 1998
Companies based in Oklahoma
Barbecue sauces
Brand name condiments
Condiment companies of the United States
1998 establishments in Oklahoma
NASCAR controversies
American open-wheel car racing controversies